Carl Galle (born 5 October 1872 in Berlin, German Empire; died 18 April 1963 in Pankow, East Berlin, East Germany) was a German middle distance runner. He competed at the 1896 Summer Olympics in Athens. Galle competed in the 1500 metres. The race was run in a single heat. Galle finished fourth, behind Edwin Flack (Australia), Arthur Blake (United States), and Albin Lermusiaux (France).

References

External links

1872 births
1963 deaths
Athletes from Berlin
German male middle-distance runners
Athletes (track and field) at the 1896 Summer Olympics
19th-century sportsmen
Olympic athletes of Germany
BFC Germania 1888 players
German footballers
Association footballers not categorized by position